West Pennine is a ward within the borough of Blackburn with Darwen, represented by three borough councillors. It was created in May 2018 when areas of the former wards of North Turton with Tockholes, East Rural, and Whitehall were merged as part of a Boundary Commission review. West Pennine encompasses a number of rural villages, including Belmont, Chapeltown, Edgworth, Hoddlesden, and Eccleshill alongside parts of Whitehall in Darwen. Landmarks include Winter Hill and Turton Tower.

The ward is represented by three elected Councillors, and the three current incumbents are all members of the Conservative Party.

Election Results

Elections in the 2010s

References 

Blackburn with Darwen
2018 establishments in the United Kingdom